Langham is a village and a civil parish in the English county of Norfolk.

The village is on the B1156 road between Blakeney and Sharrington. The nearest railway station is at Sheringham on the Bittern Line running to Norwich. The nearest airport is Norwich International Airport.

About 60% of the parish lies within the Norfolk Coast Area of Outstanding Natural Beauty.

History
Langham has an entry in the Domesday Book of 1085. It is recorded by the names "Lagaam", and "Lang(a)ham", the main tenant being William de Beaufeu. The survey notes that there are two churches and this is reflected by the double dedication of the remaining 14th century church of St Andrew and St Mary.  The church lies at the centre of the modern village.

Langham Hall is a Grade II-listed Georgian country house.

The parish was the location of RAF Langham airfield during the Second World War and the remains of the runway and airfield buildings still exist to the west of the village along the road to Cockthorpe, including the Langham Dome Trainer which is the youngest Ancient Monument in Norfolk.

Notable people
Frederick Marryat, (1792 – 1848) was a naval officer and a novelist. He settled in Langham in 1848. His best known work is the novel Children of the New Forest which he published in 1847. He is now known for the semi-autobiographical novel Mr Midshipman Easy. Marryat is buried in the parish church yard.

Stephen Rippingall, son of the vicar in the 1850s was a first-class cricketer and champion rower, who died young and is buried in the church yard.

Historic gallery

References

External links
 Langham Village website

Villages in Norfolk
Civil parishes in Norfolk
North Norfolk